Gil Cohen (born 8 November, 2000), is an Israeli professional football player who plays as a defender for F.C. Ashdod.

Early life
Cohen was born in Ashdod, Israel, to a family of Jewish descent.

References

External links

2000 births
Living people
Israeli footballers
Association football defenders
F.C. Ashdod players
Israeli Premier League players
Footballers from Ashdod
Israeli Jews